Kaj Derakht (also known as Kalāteh-ye Kaj Derakht) is a village in Balaband Rural District, in the Central District of Fariman County, Razavi Khorasan Province, Iran. At the 2006 census, its population was 48, in 10 families.

References 

Populated places in Fariman County